This Is Jesus Culture is the first compilation album by American Christian worship band Jesus Culture. The album was released on April 7, 2015 by Jesus Culture Music alongside Sparrow Records. Jeremy Edwardson, Nathan Grubbs and Brian Johnson worked together on the production of the album.

The album is a compilation of popular songs by Jesus Culture recorded between 2010 and 2014, and also includes two new songs recorded live at the Jesus Culture Conference in Sacramento, California.

Critical reception
AllMusic's Mark Deming wrote a positive review of the album, saying "This Is Jesus Culture is an impressive introduction to the group's music as well as an inspiring look at the passionate, powerful sounds that have made then one of the most popular and respected Christian music groups of their day."

Track listing

Personnel 
Adapted from AllMusic.

 Kim Walker-Smith – vocals, backing vocals 
 Jeremy Edwardson – programming 
 Ian McIntosh – Fender Rhodes, keyboards, loops, programming
 Martin Smith – keyboards, acoustic guitar
 Justin Byrne – guitars
 Stuart Garrard – guitars
 Joel Kilmer – guitars
 Jeffrey Kunde – acoustic guitar, guitars
 Chris Quilala – electric guitars, rhythm guitar, guitars, drums, vocals, backing vocals 
 Skyler Smith – acoustic guitar, electric guitars, percussion
 Brandon Aaronson – bass
 Josh Fisher – drums
 Derek Johnson – percussion
 Molly Williams – backing vocals

Production 
 Banning Liebscher – executive producer
 Kim Walker-Smith – executive producer
 Jeremy Edwardson – producer, engineer
 Nathan Grubbs – producer
 Brian Johnson – producer
 Adam French – engineer, editing
 Timothy Powell – engineer
 Jacob Wise – engineer
 Patrick Everett – assistant engineer
 Andrew Jackson – assistant engineer, engineer
 Brett Jimison – assistant engineer
 Sam Gibson – mixing
 Jeremy Griffith – mixing
 Ainslie Grosser – mixing 
 Greg Calbi – mastering
 Troy Glessner – mastering
 Drew Lavyne – mastering
 Joshua Wurzelbacher – design
 Skylauki Productions – art direction

Charts

Release history

References 

2015 compilation albums
Jesus Culture albums
Sparrow Records albums
Christian music compilation albums